Mitratapide is a veterinary drug for the treatment of overweight and obese dogs sold under the brand name Yarvitan. Its mechanism of action involves inhibition of microsomal triglyceride transfer protein (MTP) which is responsible for the absorption of dietary lipids.  Clinical study also suggests that mitratapide may help to reverse insulin resistance in dogs.

The drug was developed by Janssen Pharmaceutica and is chemically related to the antifungal drugs such as itraconazole which were also developed by Janssen.

Mitratapide (under the brand name Yarvitan) was authorized for use in the EU by the European Medicines Agency for helping weight loss in dogs, but it has since been withdrawn from the market in the EU.

See also 
 Dirlotapide

References 

Veterinary drugs
Antiobesity drugs
para-Methoxyphenylpiperazines
Phenylpiperazines
Triazoles
Ketals